Legislative elections were held in El Salvador on 8 March 1970. The result was a victory for the National Conciliation Party, which won 34 of the 52 seats. However, the election was marred by massive fraud. Voter turnout was just 41.6%.

Results

References

Bibliography
Political Handbook of the world, 1970. New York, 1971. 
Anderson, Thomas P. 1988. Politics in Central America: Guatemala, El Salvador, Honduras, and Nicaragua. New York: Praeger. Revised edition.
Caldera T., Hilda. 1983. Historia del Partido Demócrata Cristiano de El Salvador. Tegucigalpa: Instituto Centroamericano de Estudios Políticos.
Eguizábal, Cristina. 1984. "El Salvador: elecciones sin democracia." Polemica (Costa Rica) 14/15:16-33 (marzo-junio 1984).
Haggerty, Richard A., ed. 1990. El Salvador, a country study. Washington: Library of Congress, Federal Research Division.
Herman, Edward S. and Frank Brodhead. 1984. Demonstration elections: U.S.-staged elections in the Dominican Republic, Vietnam, and El Salvador. Boston: South End Press.
Montgomery, Tommie Sue. 1995. Revolution in El Salvador: from civil strife to civil peace. Boulder: Westview.
Webre, Stephen. 1979. José Napoleón Duarte and the Christian Democratic Party in Salvadoran Politics 1960-1972. Baton Rouge: Louisiana State University Press.
White, Alastair. 1973. El Salvador. New York: Praeger Publishers.
Williams, Philip J. and Knut Walter. 1997. Militarization and demilitarization in El Salvador's transition to democracy. Pittsburgh: University of Pittsburgh Press.

El Salvador
Legislative elections in El Salvador
1970 in El Salvador